Guzara (Gozareh) is a village and the center of Guzara District in Herat Province, Afghanistan on  at 992 m altitude. The Herat Airfield is very close to the village to the east.

References

See also
Herat Province

Populated places in Herat Province